Five Star Laundry is the debut studio album by Australian post-grunge band, Motor Ace, which was released on 5 March 2001. It peaked at No. 4 on the ARIA Albums Chart. It exposed Motor Ace to the Australian public, especially by listeners of national youth radio station, Triple J.

Singles
The album provided three singles, "American Shoes" (June 2000), "Death Defy" (November 2000) and "Hey Driver" (February 2001).

On the Triple J Hottest 100, 2000 both "American Shoes" (No. 65) and "Death Defy" (No. 98) were listed. "Hey Driver" appeared in the 2001 listing at No. 53.

Track listing 
 "Hey Driver" – 4:56
 "Death Defy" – 4:19
 "Five Star Laundry" – 4:04
 "Lorenzo" – 3:51
 "Budge" – 4:47
 "American Shoes" – 4:10
 "Siamese" – 4:56
 "Chairman of the Board" – 4:02
 "Freefall" – 4:49
 "Enemies" – 3:22
 "Criminal Past" – 3:19
 "Money and Sympathy" – 6:33

Charts

Certifications

Personnel 
 Matt Balfe - bass, backing vocals
 Damian Costin - drums, percussion
 Dave Ong - guitars, piano
 Patrick (‘Patch’) Robertson - guitar, lead vocal

References

External links 
 

2001 albums
Motor Ace albums